Čokešina is a village in the municipality of Loznica, Serbia. In the 2002 census, the village had a population of 881 people.

References

Populated places in Mačva District